Seigneur is an originally feudal title in France before the Revolution, in New France and British North America until 1854, and in the Channel Islands to this day. A seigneur refers to the person or collective who owned a seigneurie (or seigneury)—a form of land tenure—as a fief, with its associated rights over person and property. A seigneur could be an individual—male or female (seigneuresse), noble or non-noble (roturier)—or a collective entity such a religious community, monastery, seminary, college, or parish. 

This form of lordship was called seigneurie, the rights that the seigneur was entitled to were called seigneuriage, and the jurisdiction exercised was seigneur justicier over his fief. 

In the wake of the French Revolution, seigneurialism was repealed in France on 4 August 1789 and in the Province of Canada on 18 December 1854. Since then, the feudal title has only been applicable in the Channel Islands and for sovereign princes by their families.

Etymology 
Seigneur descends from Middle French seigneur, from Old French seignor (oblique form of sire), from Latin seniōrem, the accusative singular of senior (from comparative of senex, ‘old, aged, elderly’). Doublet of senior, sire and sir, seignior, sieur and monsieur. 

In English, seigneur is the preferred (if not exclusive) term used in reference to the French seigneurial system and its descendants. The analogous term in the English feudal system is lord. The word shares the same provenance as the Italian Signore, Portuguese Senhor and Spanish Señor, which in addition to meaning "Mister" were used to signify a feudal lord.

The term grand seigneur has survived. Today this usually means an elegant, urbane gentleman. Some even use it in a stricter sense to refer to a man whose manners and way of life reflect his noble ancestry and great wealth. In addition, Le Grand Seigneur had long been the name given by the French to the Ottoman sultan. Notre Seigneur Jésus-Christ is the French equivalent of the English Our Lord Jesus Christ.

The word seignorage is also derived from seigneur.

Current Use in Crown dependencies
The title is still used in the Channel Islands, self-governing territories in the English Channel which swear fealty to the British Crown as the successor to the Duke of Normandy. In particular, it refers to the Seigneur of Sark, the hereditary ruler of Sark, a jurisdiction of the Bailiwick of Guernsey. The Seigneur of Saint Ouen and the Seigneur of Samarès are titles in the Bailiwick of Jersey.

See also
 Seigneurial system of New France

References

1789 disestablishments in France
1854 disestablishments in Canada
French monarchy
 

fr:Seigneurie#Le seigneur